The first season of the animated comedy television series Ed, Edd n Eddy, created by Danny Antonucci, originally aired on Cartoon Network in the United States. Although originally set to premiere in November 1998, the season ran from January 4, 1999, to June 11, 1999, and consists of 13 episodes. The series revolves around three adolescent boys collectively known as "the Eds," who live in a suburban cul-de-sac. Unofficially led by Eddy, the Eds frequently scheme to make money off their peers in order to purchase their favorite confectionery, jawbreakers. However, their plans usually fail, leaving them in various predicaments.

Adult cartoonist Antonucci conceived Ed, Edd n Eddy while working on a commercial design. Antonucci pitched the series to Cartoon Network and Nickelodeon. Both studios were interested in the series, but each demanded creative control and Antonucci refused. Cartoon Network ended up commissioning the show after agreeing to let Antonucci have control of the show. After its debut, the series was a success in Nielsen ratings, popular among younger and older viewers. Met with generally positive reviews, the season earned Antonucci a Reuben Award for Best Television Animation.

The Complete First Season DVD was released in Region 1 in 2006 and Region 4 in 2007. Both Ed, Edd n Eddy DVD volumes, Edifying Ed-Ventures and Fools' Par-Ed-Ise, also featured season one episodes. All the DVDs were published by Warner Home Video. The entire season can also be purchased from the iTunes Store. The season was written by Antonucci, Jono Howard, Mike Kubat, and Rob Boutilier.<ref name=Creds>Credits of Ed, Edd n Eddy, season 1</ref>

Cast
Matt Hill, Samuel Vincent, and Tony Sampson were cast as Ed, Edd (Double D), and Eddy. David Paul Grove and Keenan Christenson played the parts of Jonny 2 × 4 and Jimmy, respectively, while Sarah was voiced by Janyse Jaud. Peter Kelamis voiced Rolf, while Kathleen Barr was cast as Kevin. Nazz was voiced by Tabitha St. Germain. Erin Fitzgerald played the part of May Kanker. The other two Kanker sisters, Marie and Lee, were voiced by Kathleen Barr and Janyse Jaud.

Reception

Ratings
Although originally set to premiere on November 7, 1998, it aired on January 4, 1999, as the 6th Cartoon Cartoon, due to minor post-production delays. According to Cartoon Network executive Linda Simensky, the first season did "remarkably well" in ratings following its premiere, becoming one of the top-rated series on the network, prompting Cartoon Network to quickly order-up a second season for a November 1999 premiere, and later a third and fourth.

Reviews and accolades
Reception of the first season was generally positive, though not as acclaimed as its second season. Despite giving the Edifying Ed-Ventures DVD a negative review, IGN's Mike Drucker praised the show, saying: "Every bit of the show is played for the maximum comic effect, and the interactions between the characters are usually very fun," and particularly praised the season finale, "Avast Ye Eds", saying that it is a "good example of how the animators developed a clever, surreal environment that most kids could probably relate to. They simply go wild and allow regular childhood adventures turn into comedic epics, very over-the-top, but still linked to the way that kids act and react to strange situations." While calling it a "gem" and of "entertaining nature", he criticized the storylines as "repetitive" and said the show "lacks the genius of SpongeBob". Terrence Briggs of Animation World Magazine considered every second of the show "filler" and lamented that the main characters are drawn as "products from the school of acid-trip caricature." After Briggs' review was published, a large number of letters supportive of the show were sent to the magazine, prompting it to "take a second look" at the show. Different reviewers then gave it a positive review, calling it a "fresh show with very different approaches."

The season earned Antonucci a Reuben Award for Best Television Animation. The season had a slight impact on popular culture. A journalist in Tallahassee, Florida wrote a column in his local newspaper about his search for the huge jawbreakers his children saw on Ed, Edd n Eddy. During the run of the first season, a number of fansites were already being set up.

Home media
Warner Home Video released a number of Ed, Edd n Eddy DVDs, two of which were DVD volumes. The first, titled Edifying Ed-Ventures, was released on May 10, 2005, in region 1 and on May 15, 2006, in region 2, featuring three season one episodes, "Sir Ed-a-Lot", "Who, What, Where, Ed!", and "Avast Ye Eds", out of a total six. It was followed by Fools' Par-Ed-Ise on March 21, 2006, but only featured on episode from the season, "Fool on the Ed".The Complete First Season 1.33:1 aspect ratio 294-minute two-disc set was released in region 1 on October 10, 2006, and in region 2 on July 18, 2007. The DVD is in English (Dolby Digital Stereo), and is dubbed in French and Spanish, with subtitles in English, Spanish, and French. The set includes special features such as an interview with the creator, "How to make an Ed, Edd n Eddy cartoon", "How to Draw Eddy" and a Cartoon Network commercial bumper featuring Jimmy and Plank. In 2019, this DVD was re-released with a new slipcover after having long been considered out-of-print.

The season is available for download on the iTunes Store. The Fools' Par-Ed-Ise and The Complete First Season'' DVDs can also be purchased on the Cartoon Network Shop.

Episodes

Every episode of this season is directed by Danny Antonucci.

References

External links

Ed, Edd n Eddy seasons
1999 Canadian television seasons